Auburn is an unbounded neighbourhood of the suburb of Hawthorn, Melbourne, Australia, in the state of Victoria. Its postcode is 3123.
It is in the local government areas of the City of Boroondara.

The area is renowned for its outstanding commercial Victorian architecture, including the "Auburn Hotel" (formerly the "Geebung Polo Club"), a giant 3-storey coffee palace in the Second Empire style built in 1888, part of a well-preserved streetscape on Auburn Road. Auburn Post Office opened on 10 April 1893.

The area is serviced by Auburn railway station.

References

External links
Australian Places – Auburn

Auburn
City of Boroondara